Henri de Villars may refer to:

 Henri de Villars (died 1354), French prelate
 Henri de Villars (died 1693) (c. 1621–1693), French prelate